Tahoe commonly refers to Lake Tahoe, a large freshwater lake on the California–Nevada border in the United States, a popular tourist destination.

Tahoe may also refer to:

Places

 Tahoe City, California, US, formerly called Tahoe
 Lake Tahoe (Victoria Island), lake on Victoria Island, Canada

Computing
 The Power 6/32 minicomputer by Computer Consoles Inc.
TCP Tahoe, a variant of Transmission Control Protocol
 4.3BSD-Tahoe, a release of Berkeley Software Distribution Unix
 Tahoe-LAFS (Tahoe Least-Authority File Store), a distributed filesystem
 Tahoe, an initiative that led to Microsoft SharePoint

Arts and entertainment
 Lake Tahoe, a song on the 2011 album 50 Words for Snow by Kate Bush
 Lake Tahoe (film), a 2008 Mexican drama directed by Fernando Eimbcke

Transport
 The Tahoe, a 2-6-0 locomotive on the Virginia and Truckee Railroad
 Chevrolet Tahoe, a sport utility vehicle
 SS Tahoe, a steamship that operated on Lake Tahoe
 USS Tahoe (CM-2), a former US Navy minelayer

See also
 Taho, a Philippine snack food made of fresh soft/silken tofu
 Tofu, a soy milk curd
 Sunnyside–Tahoe City, California, US
 "Fast Times in Tahoe", a song by New Zealand band Elemeno P